Camaçari Futebol Clube, commonly known as Camaçari, is a Brazilian football club from Camaçari, Bahia state. They competed in the Série D once.

History
The club was founded on November 8, 1968. They won the Campeonato Baiano Second Level in 1991 and in 1997 and the Taça Estado da Bahia in 1999. They competed in the Série D in 2010, when they were eliminated in the First Stage.

Achievements

 Campeonato Baiano Second Level:
 Winners (2): 1991, 1997
 Taça Estado da Bahia:
 Winners (1): 1999

Stadium
Camaçari Futebol Clube play their home games at Estádio Armando Oliveira. The stadium has a maximum capacity of 7,000 people.

References

External links
 Official website

Association football clubs established in 1968
Football clubs in Bahia
1968 establishments in Brazil
Camaçari